Col de la Colombière (elevation 1613 m) is a mountain pass in the Alps in the department of Haute-Savoie in France.

It connects Cluses in the Arve valley with  Le Grand-Bornand in the Bourne valley. The road then leads further to Annecy or over Col des Aravis to the Arly valley and is situated between the Massif des Bornes to the north-west and the Chaîne des Aravis to the south-east.

The pass is not an important traffic route because there are better roads that parallel it, particularly the A40 autoroute.

Details of climb
Although the pass is not very high, it is technically difficult for cyclists.

Starting from Scionzier, the climb is 16.3 km long. Over this distance, the climb is 1108 m (an average percentage of 6.8%). The steepest section is 10.2% near the summit. From Le Grand-Bornand, the Col de la Colombière is 11.7 km long. Over this distance, the climb is 690 m (an average percentage of 5.9%).

On 31 May 2015, U.S. Secretary of State John Kerry broke his leg near the start of the climb in Scionzier.

Appearances in Tour de France
The pass was first included in the Tour de France in 1960 and has since featured 23 times, most recently in 2021.

See also
 List of highest paved roads in Europe
 List of mountain passes

Notes

References

External links
Cycling both sides with map, video, profiles, photos
Profile on climbbybike.com
Climb profiles (French)
Col de la Colombière on Google Maps (Tour de France classic climbs)

Mountain passes of Auvergne-Rhône-Alpes
Mountain passes of the Alps
Landforms of Savoie
Transport in Auvergne-Rhône-Alpes
Climbs in cycle racing in France